"These Days" is a song written by Jeffrey Steele, Steve Robson, and Danny Wells and recorded by American country music group Rascal Flatts. It was released in June 2002 as the first single from the band’s 2002 album Melt. The song became their first number one hit on the U.S. Billboard Hot Country Singles & Tracks (now Hot Country Songs) chart in November 2002.

Content
This song is about a man who unexpectedly crosses paths with a former lover and they tell each other what has happened since they saw each other last. He tells her that since she has gone from his life, most of his time is spent thinking and dreaming about her.

Gary LeVox said of the song, "We knew this was a special song. We’d already completed the album but we dropped a song that we wrote to put this on our album."

Recording
After the completion of recording for Melt, the band learned there was money in the recording budget for several more songs. They then recorded "Love You Out Loud" and "These Days" and being so impressed by the latter they replaced a song they wrote from the album with it.

Chart performance
"These Days" debuted at number 48 on the U.S. Billboard Hot Country Singles & Tracks for the week of June 29, 2002.

Year-end charts

References

2002 singles
Rascal Flatts songs
Songs written by Jeffrey Steele
Songs written by Steve Robson
Lyric Street Records singles
Music videos directed by Deaton-Flanigen Productions
Country ballads
Song recordings produced by Mark Bright (record producer)
Songs written by Danny Wells (songwriter)
2002 songs